Wolfgang Kohlhaase (13 March 1931 – 5 October 2022) was a German screenwriter, film director, and writer. He was considered "one of the most important screenwriters in German film history", and was one of the GDR's most well-known and prolific film screenwriters. Kohlhaase was awarded the Honorary Golden Bear at the 2010 Berlin International Film Festival.

Early life 
Kohlhaase was born to machine fitter Karl Kohlhaase and his wife Charlotte, and grew up in Berlin-Adlershof. He attended elementary and secondary school. He began writing while still at school and became a volunteer and editor at the youth magazine Start in 1947. He wrote short stories and portraits. A copy of Start with an article by Kohlhaase reached the Soviet prisoner-of-war camp where Kohlhaase's father was held since 1947. The father thus rose in prestige with the prison authorities; he received both more food and easier work and was able to survive the camp. The son later became a staff member of the Free German Youth (FDJ) magazine Junge Welt. From 1950 to 1952, he worked as a dramaturge assistant at the DEFA studios in Potsdam-Babelsberg.

Career 

Kohlhaase had his first articles published while still attending school. Later on he worked as trainee writer for youth journals and as assistant dramaturge for DEFA before becoming a freelancer in 1952.

In collaboration with director Gerhard Klein he created the so-called 'Berlin Films', a popular genre about young East Berliners, inspired by Italian neorealism. Among these films are: Alarm im Zirkus (1954), Eine Berliner Romanze (1956) and Berlin – Ecke Schönhauser… (1957). Berlin, Schoenhauser Corner, a film set in Berlin and centred around the rebellious character of Ekkehard Schall, was criticised for negativity and conceding too much to neorealism. In 1961 he wrote for another Gerhard Klein film, The Gleiwitz Case (Der Fall Gleiwitz), which depicts the Gleiwitz incident on 31 August 1939, a false flag attack on a German radio station staged by the SS which was carried out to justify the Invasion of Poland. The plot was reconstructed exactly according to the statements of SS-Man Alfred Naujocks before British authorities at the Nuremberg trials. In 1963, Kohlhaase and Klein released Sonntagsfahrer (Sunday Driver), a story about six disgruntled citizens of Leipzig who flee East Germany for West Germany in 1961.

In 1968, Kohlhaase collaborated with director Konrad Wolf on I Was Nineteen (Ich war neunzehn ) which tells the story of a young German who fled the Nazis with his parents to Moscow and returns to Germany in 1945 as a lieutenant in the Red Army. Hermann Kant described the film as "the best film—in a short eternity—that has been made in Germany" at the Berlin Forum in May 1968, and it was also a major commercial success, selling 3,317,966 tickets in its initial run, making it the 41st highest grossing DEFA film.

In 1980, along with Konrad Wolf, he co-directed the film Solo Sunny. It was entered into the 30th Berlin International Film Festival, where Renate Krößner won the Silver Bear for Best Actress. In 1985, he was a member of the jury at the 35th Berlin International Film Festival.

Writing style and achievements
Directors and film connoisseurs equated his "diverse wit" and his "precise observation of individual milieus" with the skills of Erich Kästner and Billy Wilder. Kohlhaase's screenplays deal with stories from everyday life and show his interest in a differentiated, realistic portrayal of the protagonists and their respective circumstances. What is appreciated about the style of his scripted dialogues is "a terse, laconic tone," a "dialogue wit" that seems "wise to life" and is "melancholic, sometimes even bitter." On the occasion of the award of the Honorary Golden Bear for his life's work at the Berlinale 2010, the jury praised Kohlhaase's "sense of authenticity in his characters as well as in his stories, his laconic, very economical language, and his fine irony." He gave courses on screenplay writing at various universities.

From 1970 Kohlhaase was a member of the PEN Center Germany, in 1972 he became a member of the Academy of Arts of the GDR, and in 1991 he was accepted into the Academy of Arts Berlin-Brandenburg. The Association of German Screenwriters (VDD) named him an honorary member at the 2011 Berlinale. On April 8, 2011, he received the Lola for lifetime achievement from the German Film Academy. In his acceptance speech, he said, "I'm not only delighted, but also encouraged. And you need that at any age."

Personal life
He was married to the dancer and choreographer Emöke Pöstenyi (de). One of his hobbies was boxing; for decades he boxed in the senior group at SG Narva.

Filmography

Screenwriter
 1953: Die Störenfriede – Director: Wolfgang Schleif
 1954: Alarm in the Circus – Director: Gerhard Klein
 1956: A Berlin Romance – Director: Gerhard Klein
 1957: Berlin, Schoenhauser Corner – Director: Gerhard Klein
 1959: The Silent Star – Director: Kurt Maetzig
 1961: The Gleiwitz Case – Director: Gerhard Klein
 1962: Josef und alle seine Brüder (TV film) – Director: Erwin Stranka
 1963: Sunday Drivers – Director: Gerhard Klein
 1965: Berlin um die Ecke – Director: Gerhard Klein (initially unfinished, first performance 1987)
 1968: I Was Nineteen – Director: Konrad Wolf
 1970: Fish For Four (TV film)
 1973: Turek erzählt 
 1974: Der nackte Mann auf dem Sportplatz – Director: Konrad Wolf
 1976: Mama, I'm Alive – Director: Konrad Wolf
 1977: Ein Trompeter kommt – (TV, based on his radio play of the same name) Director: Edgar Kaufmann
 1978: Der Übergang – Director: Orlando Lübbert
 1980: Solo Sunny – Director: Konrad Wolf
 1982: The Turning Point – Director: Frank Beyer
 1984:  – Director: Bernhard Wicki
 1985: Die Zeit die bleibt – Director: Lew Hohmann
 1989:  – Director: Frank Beyer
 1992:  (TV film)
 1997: Der Hauptmann von Köpenick – Director: Frank Beyer
 2000: The Legend of Rita – Director: Volker Schlöndorff
 2002: Baby – Director: Philipp Stölzl
 2005: Summer in Berlin – Director: Andreas Dresen
 2009:  – Director: 
 2009:  – Director: Andreas Dresen
 2011: I Phone You – Director: Tang Dan
 2011: Nagel zum Sarg – Director: Philipp Döring
 2015: As We Were Dreaming – Director: Andreas Dresen
 2017: In Times of Fading Light – Director:

Director
 1979: Solo Sunny with Konrad Wolf
 1992:  with Gabriele Denecke
 1998: Victor Klemperer with Ullrich H. Kasten

References

External links

1931 births
2022 deaths
East German film directors
Film people from Berlin
Members of the Academy of Arts, Berlin
German male writers
Honorary Golden Bear recipients
Recipients of the Cross of the Order of Merit of the Federal Republic of Germany
Recipients of the Order of Merit of Berlin
Recipients of the Patriotic Order of Merit in silver
Recipients of the Banner of Labor
German Film Award winners
International Writing Program alumni